Guy Delumeau (born August 18, 1981) is an American mixed martial artist currently competing in the Lightweight division.

Personal life
Delumeau attended Pacific University.

Mixed martial arts record

|-
| Win
| align=center| 22-13-3
| Juri Ohara
| Decision (majority)
| DEEP: 81 Impact
| 
| align=center| 2
| align=center| 5:00
| Tokyo, Japan
|Return to Lightweight.
|-
| Loss
| align=center| 21-13-3
| Hiroto Uesako
| TKO (punches)
| DEEP: 78 Impact
| 
| align=center| 2
| align=center| 0:23
| Tokyo, Japan
| 
|-
| Loss
| align=center| 21-12-3
| Nazareno Malegarie
| Decision (unanimous)
| Pancrase: 281
| 
| align=center| 3
| align=center| 5:00
| Tokyo, Japan
| 
|-
| Win
| align=center| 21-11-3
| Satoshi Inaba
| Submission (twister)
| Pancrase: 279
| 
| align=center| 1
| align=center| 1:40
| Tokyo, Japan
| 
|-
| Loss
| align=center| 20-11-3
| Juntaro Ushiku
| TKO (knee injury)
| Pancrase: 266
| 
| align=center| 2
| align=center| 0:40
| Tokyo, Japan
| 
|-
| Loss
| align=center| 20-10-3
| Hiroyuki Takaya
| TKO (punches)
| Pancrase: 266
| 
| align=center| 3
| align=center| 4:11
| Tokyo, Japan
| 
|-
| Win
| align=center| 20-9-3
| Akitoshi Tamura
| Decision (split)
| Pancrase: 264
| 
| align=center| 3
| align=center| 5:00
| Tokyo, Japan
| 
|-
| Win
| align=center| 19-9-3
| Tomonari Kanomata
| Decision (unanimous)
| Pancrase: 260
| 
| align=center| 3
| align=center| 5:00
| Tokyo, Japan
| 
|-
| Loss
| align=center| 18-9-3
| Yuki Baba
| TKO (knee)
| Pancrase: 257
| 
| align=center| 1
| align=center| 0:30
| Yokohama, Kanagawa, Japan
| 
|-
| Win
| align=center| 18-8-3
| Hiroyuki Oshiro
| Decision (majority)
| Pancrase: 255
| 
| align=center| 2
| align=center| 5:00
| Tokyo, Japan
| 
|-
| Win
| align=center| 17-8-3
| Yojiro Uchimura
| Submission (guillotine choke)
| Pancrase: 248
| 
| align=center| 2
| align=center| 2:28
| Tokyo, Japan
| 
|-
| Loss
| align=center| 16-8-3
| Dustin Kimura
| KO (punch)
| PXC: Pacific Xtreme Combat 34
| 
| align=center| 3
| align=center| 4:44
| Quezon City, National Capital Region, Philippines
| 
|-
| Loss
| align=center| 16-7-3
| Jon Shores
| Decision (unanimous)
| Pancrase: Progress Tour 9
| 
| align=center| 3
| align=center| 5:00
| Tokyo, Japan
| 
|-
| Win
| align=center| 16-6-3
| Yo Saito
| KO (slam)
| Pancrase: Progress Tour 7
| 
| align=center| 1
| align=center| 0:21
| Tokyo, Japan
| 
|-
| Draw
| align=center| 15-6-3
| Wataru Miki
| Draw (split)
| Shooto: Survivor Tournament Final
| 
| align=center| 3
| align=center| 5:00
| Tokyo, Japan
| 
|-
| Win
| align=center| 15-6-2
| Issei Tamura
| Decision (majority)
| Shooto: Shooto the Shoot 2011
| 
| align=center| 3
| align=center| 5:00
| Tokyo, Japan
| 
|-
| Win
| align=center| 14-6-2
| Yuta Sasaki
| Decision (unanimous)
| Shooto: Shootor's Legacy 4
| 
| align=center| 3
| align=center| 5:00
| Tokyo, Japan
| 
|-
| Win
| align=center| 13-6-2
| Yusuke Yachi
| Decision (unanimous)
| Shooto: Gig Tokyo 6
| 
| align=center| 2
| align=center| 5:00
| Tokyo, Japan
| 
|-
| Draw
| align=center| 12-6-2
| Wataru Miki
| Draw
| Shooto: Gig Tokyo 5
| 
| align=center| 2
| align=center| 5:00
| Tokyo, Japan
|Featherweight debut.
|-
| Loss
| align=center| 12-6-1
| Shinji Sasaki
| Technical submission (armbar)
| Shooto: Grapplingman 10
| 
| align=center| 1
| align=center| 2:54
| Okayama, Japan
| 
|-
| Win
| align=center| 12-5-1
| Mateus Irie Nechio
| Decision (unanimous)
| Shooto: The Rookie Tournament 2009 Final
| 
| align=center| 2
| align=center| 5:00
| Tokyo, Japan
| 
|-
| Win
| align=center| 11-5-1
| Jin Kazeta
| Decision (unanimous)
| Shooto: Gig Tokyo 3
| 
| align=center| 2
| align=center| 5:00
| Tokyo, Japan
| 
|-
| Win
| align=center| 10-5-1
| Komei Okada
| KO (punch)
| Shooto: Gig Saitama 1
| 
| align=center| 2
| align=center| 3:44
| Fujimi, Saitama, Japan
| 
|-
| Draw
| align=center| 9-5-1
| Yukinari Tamura
| Draw
| Shooto: Shooting Disco 9: Superman
| 
| align=center| 2
| align=center| 5:00
| Tokyo, Japan
| 
|-
| Loss
| align=center| 9-5
| Ikuo Usuda
| Decision (majority)
| Shooto: Shooting Disco 8: We Are Tarzan!
| 
| align=center| 2
| align=center| 5:00
| Tokyo, Japan
| 
|-
| Win
| align=center| 9-4
| Kunio Nakajima
| Submission (rear-naked choke)
| Shooto: Shooting Disco 7: Young Man
| 
| align=center| 2
| align=center| 1:33
| Tokyo, Japan
| 
|-
| Win
| align=center| 8-4
| Paolo Milano
| TKO (punches)
| Shooto: The Rookie Tournament 2008 Final
| 
| align=center| 2
| align=center| 4:09
| Tokyo, Japan
| 
|-
| Win
| align=center| 7-4
| Hisaki Hiraishi
| Decision (unanimous)
| Shooto: Shooting Disco 6: Glory Shines In You
| 
| align=center| 2
| align=center| 5:00
| Tokyo, Japan
| 
|-
| Loss
| align=center| 6-4
| Kazuya Hirose
| KO (spinning back fist)
| DEEP: clubDEEP Tokyo
| 
| align=center| 1
| align=center| 1:40
| Tokyo, Japan
| 
|-
| Win
| align=center| 6-3
| Hideo Matsui
| TKO (punches)
| DEEP: clubDEEP Tokyo
| 
| align=center| 2
| align=center| 4:02
| Tokyo, Japan
| 
|-
| Loss
| align=center| 5-3
| Shinobu Miura
| Decision (majority)
| Shooto: Shooting Disco 3: Everybody Fight Now
| 
| align=center| 2
| align=center| 5:00
| Tokyo, Japan
| 
|-
| Loss
| align=center| 5-2
| Hiroshi Shiba
| Submission (triangle choke)
| Shooto: Shooting Disco 1: Saturday Night Hero
| 
| align=center| 1
| align=center| 1:58
| Tokyo, Japan
| 
|-
| Loss
| align=center| 5-1
| Toshikazu Iseno
| Decision (unanimous)
| Shooto: Battle Mix Tokyo 2
| 
| align=center| 2
| align=center| 5:00
| Tokyo, Japan
| 
|-
| Win
| align=center| 5-0
| Minoru Tavares
| TKO (punches)
| DEEP: 27 Impact
| 
| align=center| 2
| align=center| 3:58
| Tokyo, Japan
| 
|-
| Win
| align=center| 4-0
| Kenta Okuyama
| TKO (injury)
| DEEP: clubDEEP Tokyo: Future King Tournament 2006
| 
| align=center| 1
| align=center| 0:38
| Tokyo, Japan
| 
|-
| Win
| align=center| 3-0
| Yuta Nabekubo
| Decision (unanimous)
| DEEP: clubDEEP Tokyo: Future King Tournament 2006
| 
| align=center| 2
| align=center| 5:00
| Tokyo, Japan
| 
|-
| Win
| align=center| 2-0
| Atsushi Hyuga
| KO (punch)
| DEEP: clubDEEP Tokyo: Future King Tournament 2006
| 
| align=center| 1
| align=center| 0:05
| Tokyo, Japan
| 
|-
| Win
| align=center| 1-0
| Michiyuki Ishibashi
| Submission (straight armbar)
| G-Shooto: G-Shooto Special03
| 
| align=center| 2
| align=center| 2:15
| Tokyo, Japan
|

Mixed martial arts amateur record

|-
| Win
| align=center| 2-0
| Brad Horner
| Submission
| SF 4: Fight For Freedom
| 
| align=center| 2
| align=center| N/A
| Gresham, Oregon, United States
| 
|-
| Win
| align=center| 1-0
| Jesse Hamm
| Submission
| FCFF: Rumble at the Roseland 13
| 
| align=center| 1
| align=center| N/A
| Portland, Oregon, United States
|

See also
List of male mixed martial artists

References

External links
 

1981 births
American male mixed martial artists
Featherweight mixed martial artists
Lightweight mixed martial artists
Living people